Keputran is an administrative village in the district of Tegalsari, Surabaya in East Java.

Administrative villages in East Java